The following highways are numbered 1. 
For roads numbered A1, see list of A1 roads.  
For roads numbered B1, see list of B1 roads.  
For roads numbered M1, see List of M1 roads. 
For roads numbered N1, see list of N1 roads. 
For roads numbered S1, see List of highways numbered S1.

International

 Asian Highway 1, an international route from Japan to the Turkish-Bulgarian border
 European route E01 (Northern Ireland to Spain)
 European route E001 (Georgia to Armenia)
 Cairo–Dakar Highway

Afghanistan
Highway 1 (Afghanistan), also called A01 and formally called the Ring Road, circles Afghanistan connecting Kabul, Ghazni, Kandahar, Farah, Herat, and Mazar.

Albania
 National Road 1 (Albania), road running from border Montenegro (Hani i Hotit) to Tirana.
 Albania–Kosovo Highway

Algeria
 Algeria East–West Highway

Andorra
 CG-1

Argentina
 National Route 1
 National Route A001
 Santa Fe Provincial Highway 01

Australia

 Highway 1 (Australia), a highway connecting all of the country's state capitals and also Darwin, Northern Territory.
 All Motorways in the route of National Highway 1
 Tolled Motorway in the route of National Highway 1
 All roads with national significance on National Highway 1
 In QLD and WA
 Part of it is the NT and SA
 Ring Route 1, South Australia
 - Detour of the M1 Pacific Motorway
 Wollogorang Road (Borroloola to Queensland Border) replaces National Route 1
 Highway 1 (Tasmania)

Austria

 West Autobahn

Bangladesh

Belarus
 M1 highway (Belarus)

Belgium
  Autoroute A1 - Autosnelweg A1 - Autobahn A1

Bosnia and Herzegovina
 A1 (Bosnia and Herzegovina)

Bulgaria
 Trakia motorway
 I-1 road (Bulgaria)

Cambodia
 National Highway 1 (Cambodia)

Canada

Parts of the Trans-Canada Highway
 Alberta Highway 1
 Alberta Highway 1A
 Alberta Highway 1X
 British Columbia Highway 1
  British Columbia Highway 1A
 Manitoba Highway 1
  Manitoba Highway 1A
 Newfoundland and Labrador Route 1
 Prince Edward Island Route 1
  Route 1A (Prince Edward Island)
 Saskatchewan Highway 1

Other instances of Highway 1
 New Brunswick Route 1
 Nova Scotia Trunk 1
 Northwest Territories Highway 1
 Quebec Route 1 (former)
 Yukon Highway 1

Chile
 Chile Route 1

China
 G1 Expressway
 G1N Expressway
 G0102 Expressway
 G0111 Expressway
 S01 Expressway (Anhui)
 S1 Expressway (Guangdong)
 S1 Expressway (Henan)
 S1 Expressway (Hubei)
 S01 Expressway (Hunan)
 S1 Expressway (Shandong)
 S1 Expressway (Shanghai)
 S1 Expressway (Sichuan)
 S1 Expressway (Tianjin)
 S1 Expressway (Tibet)
 S1 Expressway (Zhejiang)

Colombia
 National Route 1

Costa Rica
 National Route 1

Cuba
 Autopista A1 (Cuba)

Cyprus
 A1 motorway (Cyprus)
 B1 road (Cyprus)

Czech Republic 
 D1 from Prague to Ostrava

Djibouti
  RN-1 (Djibouti)

Dominican Republic
 DR-1

Estonia
 Estonian national road 1

Equatorial Guinea
 AP-1 Motorway (Equatorial Guinea)

Finland
 Finnish national road 1
 Åland Islands Highway 1

France 
 Autoroute A1
 Route nationale 1

Georgia
 S1 Highway
 SH1 Road (Georgia)

Germany
 Bundesautobahn 1 in Germany
 Bundesstraße 1 in Germany
 Bundesstraße 1a, branch of Bundesstraße 1

Ghana
 N1 road (Ghana)

Greece
 Motorway 1
 Greek National Road 1

Hong Kong
 Route 1 (Hong Kong)

Hungary
 M1 motorway (Hungary)
 Main road 1 (Hungary)

Iceland
 Route 1 (Iceland)

India

 State Highway 1 (Kerala)

Indonesia
 Indonesian National Route 1

Iran
 Freeway 1 (Iran)

Iraq
 Freeway 1
 Highway 1

Ireland
 M1 motorway (Republic of Ireland)
 N1 road (Ireland)

Israel
 Highway 1 (Israel/Palestine)

Italy
 Autostrada A1 (Italy)
 RA 1
 Strada statale 1
 T1

Japan

 Route 1 (Hanshin Expressway) in Osaka
 Route 1 (Nagoya Expressway)
 Route 1 (Shuto Expressway) in Tokyo

Kazakhstan
 A1 highway (Kazakhstan)

Laos
 Route 1A (Laos)
 Route 1C (Laos)
 Route 1E (Laos)
 Route 1I (Laos)

Latvia
 A1 road (Latvia)

Lithuania
 A1 highway (Lithuania)

Luxembourg
 A1 motorway (Luxembourg)

Malaysia
 Malaysia Federal Route 1
 North–South Expressway Northern Route

State Route 

 Malaysia Federal Route 1 (Sabah)
 Malaysia Federal Route 1 (Sarawak)
 Jalan Jelapang
 Jalan Meru
 Iskandar Coastal Highway
 Jalan Bedong—Kuala Muda
 Federal Route 1265 (formerly N1)
 Jalan Permatang Bendahari

Martinique
 A1 autoroute (Martinique)

Mexico
 Mexican Federal Highway 1
 Mexican Federal Highway 1D

Moldova
 M1 highway (Moldova)
 R1 road (Moldova)

Morocco
 Rabat–Tangier expressway
 National Route 1 (Morocco)

Myanmar
National Highway 1 (Myanmar)

Namibia 
 A1 road (Namibia)

Nepal
 Mahendra Highway

Netherlands
 Rijksweg 1

New Zealand
 New Zealand State Highway 1
 New Zealand State Highway 1B
 New Zealand State Highway 1C

Nicaragua
 NIC-1

Niger
Route nationale 1 (Niger), main east–west highway

North Macedonia
 A1 motorway (North Macedonia)

Pakistan
 M1 motorway (Pakistan)

Panama
 Highway 1 is the Pan-American Highway

Paraguay
 National Route 1

Peru
 Highway 1

Philippines
 Circumferential Road 1
 Radial Road 1
 N1 highway (Philippines)
 E1 expressway (Philippines)

Poland 
 A1 autostrada (Poland)
 Expressway S1 (Poland)
 National road 1 (Poland)

Portugal
 A1 motorway (Portugal)

Romania
 Drumul Național 1
 A1 motorway (Romania)

Russia
 M1 highway (Russia)

Senegal
 Autoroute A1
 N1 road (Senegal)

Serbia
 A1 motorway (Serbia)

Slovakia
 D1 motorway (Slovakia)
 R1 expressway (Slovakia)

Slovenia
 A1 motorway (Slovenia)

South Africa
 N1 road (South Africa)
M1 (East London)
M1 (Johannesburg)
M1 (Pretoria)
M1 (Durban)
M1 (Port Elizabeth)

South Korea
 Gyeongbu Expressway
 National Route 1

Spain
 Autovía A-1
 Autopista AP-1
 Autovía AS-I
 A1 motorway (Extremadura)
 Autopista GC-1
 R-1 motorway (Spain)
 A1 motorway (Aragon)
 Autovía RM-1

Sri Lanka
 Colombo-Kandy Road
 Southern Lanka Distributor

Switzerland
 A1 motorway (Switzerland)
 A1a motorway (Switzerland)
 A1h motorway (Switzerland)
 A1l motorway (Switzerland)
 A1.1 motorway (Switzerland)

Taiwan

 National Highway 1 (Taiwan)
 Provincial Highway 1 (Taiwan)

Thailand
 Thailand Route 1 (Phahonyothin Road)

Tunisia
 A1 motorway (Tunisia)

Turkey
  Otoyol 1

Ukraine
 Highway M01 (Ukraine)
 Highway H01 (Ukraine)

United Kingdom
 M1 motorway
 A1 road (Great Britain)
 A1(M) motorway
 A1 road (Isle of Man)
 A1 road (Jersey)
 M1 motorway (Northern Ireland)
 A1 road (Northern Ireland)

United States
 Interstate A-1 (Alaska; unsigned)
 Interstate H-1 (Hawaii)
 U.S. Route 1
 U.S. Route 1A
 U.S. Route 1 Business (Georgia)
 U.S. Route 1 Business (Maryland)
 New England Route 1 (former)
State highway systems
 Alabama State Route 1
 Alaska Route 1
 Arkansas Highway 1
 California State Route 1; merges in some places with U.S. Route 101
 Colorado State Highway 1
 Delaware Route 1
 Delaware Route 1A
 Delaware Route 1B
 Delaware Route 1D
 Florida State Road A1A
 Georgia State Route 1
 Idaho State Highway 1
 Illinois Route 1
 Indiana State Road 1
 Iowa Highway 1
 K-1 (Kansas highway)
 Kentucky Route 1
 Louisiana Highway 1
 Massachusetts Route 1A, Alternate route of U.S. Route 1
 M-1 (Michigan highway)
 Minnesota State Highway 1
 Mississippi Highway 1
 Missouri Route 1
 Montana Highway 1
 Nebraska Highway 1
 Nebraska Spur 1B
 Nebraska Spur 1D
 Nevada State Route 1 (former)
 New Hampshire Route 1A, Alternate route of U.S. Route 1
 New Hampshire Route 1B, Alternate route of U.S. Route 1
 New Jersey Route 1 (former)
 New Mexico State Road 1
 New York State Route 1A (former)
 New York State Route 1B (former)
 New York State Route 1X (former)
 North Dakota Highway 1
 Ohio State Route 1 (former) (1920s)
 Ohio State Route 1 (former) (1960s)
 Oklahoma State Highway 1
Pacific Highway No. 1 (Oregon)
 Pennsylvania Route 1 (former)
 Rhode Island Route 1A, Alternate route of U.S. Route 1
 Tennessee State Route 1
 Texas State Highway 1 (former)
 Texas State Highway Loop 1
 Texas State Highway NASA Road 1
 Texas Farm to Market Road 1
 Texas Ranch Road 1
 Utah State Route 1 (former)
 Secondary State Highway 1A (Washington) (former)
Routes in other areas
 American Samoa Highway 001
 Guam Highway 1
 Interstate PRI-1 (Puerto Rico; unsigned)
 Puerto Rico Highway 1
 Puerto Rico Highway 1P

Uruguay 
  Route 1 Gral. Manuel Oribe

Vietnam
  National Route 1 (Vietnam)
  National Route 1B (Vietnam)
  National Route 1C (Vietnam)
  National Route 1D (Vietnam)
  National Route 1K (Vietnam)

See also 

First Avenue (disambiguation)
First Street (disambiguation)